The 1964–65 Scottish Second Division was won by Stirling Albion who, along with second placed Hamilton Academical, were promoted to the First Division. Brechin City finished bottom.

Table

References 

 Scottish Football Archive

Scottish Division Two seasons
2
Scot